Lime is a Canadian disco band from Montreal, Quebec. The group was originally composed of married couple Denis and Denyse LePage who had a 1981 number one US Dance hit with "Your Love". They continued to perform as recently as 2018, although others have also performed under the name of Lime.

History
In 1979, Denis LePage wrote, arranged, and released an instrumental 12" single vinyl record called "The Break" under the name Kat Mandu. It appeared first on Unidisc Records. The single was successful and peaked at number three on Billboard's Disco chart.
Lime released their debut album Your Love in 1981. The title track was a gold record and a #1 Billboard Disco-chart hit in the US. 1982 saw the release of Lime's second album Lime II supported by the single "Babe We're Gonna Love Tonight", which reached #6 on the Billboard Dance Chart.

Although known for their work with Unidisc, the band also had ties to the Matra label.
Later in the band's run, Denis transitioned and they continued to perform together, however there have also been performances by Joy Dorris and Rob Hubertz under the brand of Lime.

Discography

Studio albums
 Your Love (1981)
 Lime II (1982)
 Lime 3 (1983)
 Sensual Sensation (1984)
 Lime – The Greatest Hits (1985)
 Unexpected Lovers (1985)
 Take the Love (1986)
 A Brand New Day (1988)
 Caroline (1991)
 Stillness of the Night (1998)
 Love Fury (2002)

Singles

Compilations
 The Greatest Hits (1985)

See also
List of number-one dance hits (Canada)
List of Billboard number-one dance club songs
List of artists who reached number one on the U.S. Dance Club Songs chart

References

External links
 

Musical groups established in 1979
Musical groups disestablished in 2002
Musical groups from Montreal
Canadian dance music groups
Canadian hi-NRG groups
Atco Records artists